Ignite and Rebuild is the third full-length album by metalcore band Life In Your Way. It was released in 2005 on Indianola Records.

Track listing 
"Hope Is War" - 4:04
"Light in Mine" - 3:33
"Threads of Sincerity" - 5:06
"To the Edge" - 3:52
"This, The Midnight Fight" - 4:55
"More Than Efforts" - 3:21
"Stability" - 4:13
"Evident" - 4:15
"When Rules Change" - 3:18
"The Change" - 1:49

References

2005 albums
Life in Your Way albums
Indianola Records albums